Sankar Prasad Datta is a member of the Communist Party of India (Marxist) and had won the 2014 Indian general elections from the Tripura West (Lok Sabha constituency) before losing to Pratima Bhowmik of BJP in 2019.

References

Living people
India MPs 2014–2019
Lok Sabha members from Tripura
Communist Party of India (Marxist) politicians from Tripura
Indian communists
Tripura politicians
1957 births